Jack Lester Griffiths  (8 April 1912 – 13 November 2001) was a New Zealand rugby union player. A utility back who played in every backline position except on the wing, Griffiths represented  at a provincial level, and was a member of the New Zealand national side, the All Blacks, from 1934 to 1938. He played 30 matches for the All Blacks—three of which were as captain—including seven internationals. In all he scored 50 points for the All Blacks, but none in Test matches.

As a cricketer, Griffiths played for Wanganui in the Hawke Cup in the 1938–39 season.

During World War II, Griffiths served with the 2nd New Zealand Expeditionary Force (NZEF), rising to the rank of major and serving as an aide-de-camp to Bernard Freyberg. Griffiths was awarded the Military Cross in 1945 for gallant and distinguished services in Italy, and was mentioned in dispatches. In 1940 he was captain of the 19th Infantry Battalion rugby team that won the Freyberg Cup, as well as the 2nd NZEF team that played against Combined Services.

Griffiths died in Wellington on 13 November 2001.

References

1912 births
2001 deaths
Rugby union players from Wellington City
People educated at Wellington College (New Zealand)
New Zealand rugby union players
New Zealand international rugby union players
Wellington rugby union players
Rugby union scrum-halves
Rugby union fly-halves
Rugby union centres
Rugby union fullbacks
New Zealand Rugby Football Union officials
New Zealand cricketers
New Zealand military personnel of World War II
New Zealand recipients of the Military Cross